Dendronotus elegans is a species of sea slug, a dendronotid nudibranch, a shell-less marine gastropod mollusc in the family Dendronotidae.

Distribution 
This species was described from 48 m depth off Cape Cod, Massachusetts, Atlantic Ocean . It is a possible synonym of Dendronotus frondosus.

References

Dendronotidae
Gastropods described in 1880